Param is a municipality and an island in the Southern Nomoneas (Shiki) Islands of Chuuk, Federated States of Micronesia.

Param municipality consists of Param Island, Totiw Island ( to the south) and Oan Island ( to the west).

References

External links 
 www.statoids.com/yfm.html, List of municipalities of Federated States of Micronesia, Retrieved 8 June 2018

Municipalities of Chuuk State